Banded grouper is a common name for several fishes and may refer to:

Epinephelus amblycephalus
Epinephelus awoara